Saraj is a village in Skopje, within North Macedonia. It is the seat of Saraj Municipality.

Demographics
According to the 2021 census, the village had a total of 6265 inhabitants.

Ethnic groups in the village include:
Albanians 5379
Macedonians 307
Romani 167
Bosniaks 73
Turks 11
Serbs 4
Others 1

See also
Saraj Municipality
Skopje

References

External links

Villages in Saraj Municipality
Albanian communities in North Macedonia